The second season of Taniec z Gwiazdami, the Polish edition of Dancing With the Stars, started on 11 September 2005 and ended on 4 December 2005. It was broadcast by TVN. Hubert Urbański and new presenter Katarzyna Skrzynecka were the hosts, and the judges were: Iwona Szymańska-Pavlović, Zbigniew Wodecki, Beata Tyszkiewicz and Piotr Galiński.

Couples

Scores

Red numbers indicate the lowest score for each week.
Green numbers indicate the highest score for each week.
 indicates the couple eliminated that week.
 indicates the returning couple that finished in the bottom two.
 indicates the winning couple of the week.
 indicates the runner-up of the week.

Average chart

Average dance chart

Highest and lowest scoring performances
The best and worst performances in each dance according to the judges' marks are as follows:

Episodes

Week 1
Individual judges scores in charts below (given in parentheses) are listed in this order from left to right: Piotr Galiński, Beata Tyszkiewicz, Zbigniew Wodecki, Iwona Pavlović.

Running order

Week 2
Individual judges scores in charts below (given in parentheses) are listed in this order from left to right: Iwona Pavlović, Zbigniew Wodecki, Beata Tyszkiewicz, Piotr Galiński.

Running order

Week 3
Individual judges scores in charts below (given in parentheses) are listed in this order from left to right: Iwona Pavlović, Zbigniew Wodecki, Beata Tyszkiewicz, Piotr Galiński.

Running order

Week 4
Individual judges scores in charts below (given in parentheses) are listed in this order from left to right: Iwona Pavlović, Zbigniew Wodecki, Beata Tyszkiewicz, Piotr Galiński.

Running order

Week 5
Individual judges scores in charts below (given in parentheses) are listed in this order from left to right: Iwona Pavlović, Zbigniew Wodecki, Beata Tyszkiewicz, Piotr Galiński.

Running order

Week 6: Movie Week
Individual judges scores in charts below (given in parentheses) are listed in this order from left to right: Iwona Pavlović, Zbigniew Wodecki, Beata Tyszkiewicz, Piotr Galiński.

Running order

Week 7: Polish Week
Individual judges scores in charts below (given in parentheses) are listed in this order from left to right: Iwona Pavlović, Zbigniew Wodecki, Beata Tyszkiewicz, Piotr Galiński.

Running order

Week 8: 80s Week
Individual judges scores in charts below (given in parentheses) are listed in this order from left to right: Iwona Pavlović, Zbigniew Wodecki, Beata Tyszkiewicz, Piotr Galiński.

Running order

Week 9: 70s Week
Individual judges scores in charts below (given in parentheses) are listed in this order from left to right: Iwona Pavlović, Zbigniew Wodecki, Beata Tyszkiewicz, Piotr Galiński.

Running order

Week 10: Final
Individual judges scores in charts below (given in parentheses) are listed in this order from left to right: Iwona Pavlović, Zbigniew Wodecki, Beata Tyszkiewicz, Piotr Galiński.

Running order

Other Dances

Dances chart
The celebrities and professional partners danced one of these routines for each corresponding week:
 Week 1 (Season Premiere): Cha-Cha-Cha or Waltz
 Week 2: Rumba or Quickstep
 Week 3: Jive or Tango
 Week 4: Paso Doble or Foxtrot
 Week 5: Samba
 Week 6 (Movie Week): One unlearned dance
 Week 7 (Polish Week): One unlearned dance & Group Viennese Waltz
 Week 8 (80's Week): One unlearned dance & one repeated dance
 Week 9 (70's Week): One unlearned dance & one repeated dance
 Week 10 (Season Finale): Favorite Latin dance, favorite Ballroom dance & Freestyle

 Highest scoring dance
 Lowest scoring dance
 Performed, but not scored

Episode results

 This couple came in first place with the judges.
 This couple came in first place with the judges and gained the highest number of viewers' votes.
 This couple gained the highest number of viewers' votes.
 This couple came in last place with the judges.
 This couple came in last place with the judges and was eliminated.
 This couple was eliminated.
 This couple won the competition.
 This couple came in second in the competition.
 This couple came in third in the competition.

Audience voting results

Guest performances

Rating figures

References

External links
 Official Site - Taniec z gwiazdami
 Taniec z gwiazdami on Polish Wikipedia

Season 02
2005 Polish television seasons